Cuicatec is an Oto-Manguean language spoken in Oaxaca, Mexico. It belongs to the Mixtecan branch together with the Mixtec languages and the Trique language. The Ethnologue lists two major dialects of Cuicatec: Tepeuxila Cuicatec and Teutila Cuicatec. Like other Oto-Manguean languages, Cuicatec is tonal.

The Cuicatecs are closely related to the Mixtecs. They inhabit two towns: Teutila and Tepeuxila in western Oaxaca. According to the 2000 census, they number around 23,000, of whom an estimated 65% are speakers of the language. The name Cuicatec is a Nahuatl exonym, from  'song'  'inhabitant of place of'.

Cuicatec-language programming is carried by the CDI's radio station XEOJN, based in San Lucas Ojitlán, Oaxaca.

Phonology

Vowels 
The Santa Maria Papalo dialect contains six vowel sounds both oral and nasal:

Consonants 

Allophones of the following sounds /β ð ɣ n j t tʃ/ include [b d ɡ~x ŋ j̈ θ ʃ], respectively.

Notes

Bibliography 

Anderson, E. Richard & Hilario Concepción R. 1983. Diccionario cuicateco: español-cuicateco, cuicateco-español. Mexico City: Instituto Lingüístico de Verano.
Bradley, David P. 1991. A preliminary syntactic sketch of Concepción Pápalo Cuicatec. In C. Henry Bradley and Barbara E. Hollenbach (eds.), Studies in the syntax of Mixtecan languages 3, pp. 409–506. Dallas: Summer Institute of Linguistics and the University of Texas at Arlington.
Campbell, Lyle. 1997. American Indian languages: the historical linguistics of Native America. Oxford: Oxford University Press.
Needham, Doris & Marjorie Davis. 1946. Cuicateco phonology.  International Journal of American Linguistics 12: 139-46.
Prewett, Joanne and Omer E. 1974. The Segmental Phonology of Cuicateco of Santa María Pápalo Oaxaca, Mexico, pp. 53-92

Indigenous languages of Mexico
Mixtecan languages